Saint Faber (also St  or St Febor) is the patron saint of the Sacred Heart Church in Boho, County Fermanagh and of Monea.

One of the first references to St Faber's is in the text of the manuscript known as The Martyrology of Oengus the Culdee Óengus of Tallaght estimated to have been written at the beginning of the 9th century. This links the saint with Boho (Botha) and Tuath Ratha (Tir Ratha) together with her feast day (6 November), as follows: "". This is reiterated in the 1630 text, "The Martyrology of Donegal: a Calendar of the Saints of Ireland".

There is a popular myth that St Faber had a pet deer which carried the sacred books that she was entrusted with. One day, as she was travelling to meet Baron O Phelan at his castle in Boho, the deer was harassed by some hunting hounds. In order to escape, the deer jumped into the Sillees River and in the process ruined St Fabers books. The saint then placed a curse on the river that it would run backwards, (previously, the Sillees river ran from Boho towards the sea) "the river writhed and recoiled," and now its route goes towards upper Lough Erne rather than the sea. The second part of her curse was that the river would be good for drowning and bad for fishing. If you look closely at the river route today you can still see some of the old routes that have dried up or formed oxbow-like depressions in the ground.

It is reputed that Saint Faber set up a monastery/nunnery in Boho, possibly at the site of the church in Toneel North and introduced Christianity to the area. There are several sites associated with St Faber around Boho including St Faber's bullán (rock cut basin) and St Faber's well, both found in the townland of Killydrum, Boho.

References 

6th-century Christian saints
6th-century Irish nuns
Irish folklore
Religion in County Fermanagh
Medieval Irish saints
People from County Fermanagh
Year of death unknown
5th-century Irish people
Year of birth unknown
Female saints of medieval Ireland
5th-century Irish women